Cupșeni is a commune in Maramureș County, Transylvania, Romania. It is composed of four villages: Costeni (Kosztafalva), Cupșeni, Libotin (Libaton), and Ungureni (Nemesbudafalva).

The river Rotunda and its tributary, Șatra, flow through Libotin.

References

Communes in Maramureș County
Localities in Transylvania